KOIW-LP was a low-power television station licensed to Mountain View, Hawaii, broadcasting locally on NTSC UHF analog channel 16.

Due to its low-power status, Oceanic Cable was not required to carry the station.

The station's license was canceled in 2011.

References

External links

OIW-LP
Television channels and stations disestablished in 2011
Defunct television stations in the United States
Television channels and stations established in 1990
1990 establishments in Hawaii
2011 disestablishments in Hawaii
OIW-LP